Chintamani is an Indian Marathi language film directed by Sangeeta Balchandran. The film stars Bharat Jadhav, Amruta Subhash, Tejashree Walawalkar and Ruchita Jadhav. Music by Sanjeev Kohli. The film was released on 31 October 2014.

Synopsis 
The story of a common man, who shares a normal life with his wife and daughter. But at the same time, he is tired of being mocked by others for being a nobody. His life takes a sharp turn when he gets involved in a get-rich-quick scheme and must fight for his survival.

Cast 
 Bharat Jadhav as Chintamani 
 Amruta Subhash as Aarti
 Tejashree Walawalkar as Kimaya 
 Ruchita Jadhav as Neha
 Uday Tikekar
 Hemangee Rao
 Milind Shinde
 Kamlesh Sawant
 Jayraj Nair 
 Kishor Pradhan
 Shobha Pradhan
 Maadhav Deochake

Soundtrack

Critical response 
Chintamani film received negative reviews from critics. Mihir Bhanage of The Times of India gave the film 2 stars out of 5 and wrote "Clichéd dialogues and a predictable storyline are the major drawbacks in this film. The loose ends and unexplained addition of characters only adds to the woes". Ganesh Matkari of Pune Mirror wrote " A pity because the failure of the film is not in the genre itself but the poor treatment it receives here". A Reviewer of  Maharashtra Times Wrote "The dialogue seems dull. The rest is 'thank you' on the levels of music and songwriting. The worst part is the length of the movie". A Reviewer of Loksatta says "I don't understand the intention of the writer-director for showing such irrationality. Many pre-interval scenes make the movie boring and ridiculous".

References

External links
 

2014 films
2010s Marathi-language films
Indian drama films